Målselv is a municipality in Troms og Finnmark county, Norway. The administrative centre of the municipality is the village of Moen. The main commercial centre of the municipality is the Bardufoss area (including Andselv, Andslimoen, and Heggelia). Other villages in the municipality include Alappmoen, Fossmoen, Holmen, and Skjold. Besides bordering Sweden to the east and the ocean (Malangen fjord) to the northwest, it borders the municipalities of Balsfjord, Storfjord, Bardu, Sørreisa, and Lenvik.

The  municipality is the 11th largest by area out of the 356 municipalities in Norway. Målselv is the 149th most populous municipality in Norway with a population of 6,599.

General information
The municipality of Maalselven was established in 1848 when it was separated from the large Lenviken Municipality. The initial population of Maalselven was 2,616. In 1891, some parts of the Maalsnes area (population: 30) were transferred to neighboring Malangen municipality. On 1 January 1904, an area with 5 inhabitants was transferred from Balsfjord Municipality to Maalselven. The spelling of the name was changed to Målselv in 1918. On 1 July 1925, the eastern district of the municipality was separated from Målselv to form the new Øverbygd municipality. This left Målselv with 3,531 residents.

During the 1960s, there were many municipal mergers across Norway due to the work of the Schei Committee. On 1 January 1964, the municipality of Øverbygd (population: 1,232), the municipality of Målselv (population: 5,584), the Naveren and Målsnes areas of Malangen (population: 118), and the "Skogli ved Heia" farm in Balsfjord (population: 2) were all merged to form a new, larger municipality of Målselv with a new population of 6,936. On 1 January 1966, the Sørelvmo/Aursfjordbotn area (population: 131) was transferred from Balsfjord to Målselv. Then on 1 January 1972, the "Blomli i Fagerfjell" area of Målselv (population: 63) was transferred to Lenvik Municipality.

On 1 January 2020, the municipality became part of the newly formed Troms og Finnmark county. Previously, it had been part of the old Troms county.

Name
The municipality (originally the parish) is named after the river Målsevla which flows through the area. The first element is the genitive case of the old uncompounded name of the Malangen fjord which means "bag" or "sack" (referring to the shape of the fjord). Prior to 1918, the name was written "Maalselven".

Coat of arms
The coat of arms was granted on 1 February 1985. The official blazon is "Vert, a pile wavy argent issuant from base dexter". This means the arms have a green field (background) and the charge is a wavy line rising from the bottom left to the top right. The wavy line has a tincture of argent which means it is commonly colored white, but if it is made out of metal, then silver is used. The arms are a canting that represent the Målselva river which runs on serpentine-like loops through a fertile valley as it passes through the municipality. The green color symbolizes the fertile valley and the wavy white or silver line represents the river. The arms were designed by Ottar Jarl Myrvang.

Churches
The Church of Norway has two parishes within the municipality of Målselv. It is part of the Indre Troms prosti (deanery) in the Diocese of Nord-Hålogaland.

Geography
Målselv was settled by farmers from southern Norway, especially Østerdalen from 1788 and onwards. They were attracted by the vast forests and areas of fertile land in the broad Målselvdalen. The valley and municipality take their name from the river Målselva. The river is well known for its salmon, and forms the Målselv waterfall, which has been selected as Norway's national waterfall. The Målselva empties into the Malangen fjord north of Olsborg. There are several mountains in the municipality:  Njunis is the highest and Istind is popular among hikers. There are many lakes such as Andsvatnet, Finnfjordvatnet, Rostojávri, Lille Rostavatn, and Takvatnet. One of the rarest orchids in Europe, Lysiella oligantha, is found in Målselv. Øvre Dividal National Park is located in the easternmost part of Målselv, near the border with Sweden.

Media gallery

Climate
Målselv has a boreal climate (Köppen climate classification: Dfc) with cold winters, and with spring and early summer as the driest season.

Målselv is fairly sheltered from the coastal weather, and has a somewhat inland climate. The all-time high  is from July 2018, while the warmest month on record at Bardufoss Airport is July 2014 with average daily high  and mean . The all-time low  was recorded December 1978. The coldest month recorded is February 1966 with mean  and average daily low .

There is on average 93 days each winter with daily low  or colder, and 28 days with low  or colder. The winter season sees on average 68 days with at least  snow cover on the ground, 126 days with at least  snow cover, and 179 days with at least  snow cover. In the warm season there is on average 116 days each year when the daily average high reaches  or warmer and 22 days with daily average high above . Precipitation is fairly moderate, there is on average 75 days per year with at least  precipitation and 15 days per year with at least  precipitation. This is based on data from Met.no with 1971–2000 as base period. The average date for first overnight freeze (below ) in autumn is 4 September (1981-2010 average).

Government
All municipalities in Norway, including Målselv, are responsible for primary education (through 10th grade), outpatient health services, senior citizen services, unemployment and other social services, zoning, economic development, and municipal roads. The municipality is governed by a municipal council of elected representatives, which in turn elect a mayor. The municipality falls under the Senja District Court and the Hålogaland Court of Appeal.

Municipal council
The municipal council  of Målselv is made up of 23 representatives that are elected to four-year terms. The party breakdown of the council is as follows:

Mayors
The mayors of Målselv (incomplete list):

1849-1852: Ole Krogseng 	
1852-1856: E.A. Sandeggen 	
1857-1859: Ole Krogseng 	
1859-1860: Tollef Olsen Fagerlidal 	
1861-1871: E.A. Sandeggen 	
1871-1872: M. Hay 	
1873-1876: Lars I. Fagerlidal 	
1877-1877: Martens 	
1877-1882: Tollef Olsen 	
1883-1890: Ole Tollefsen Fagerlidal 	
1891-1894: Monrad Hay 
1895-1910: Erik Myre 	
1911-1913: Rønning Tollefsen 	
1913-1915: Erik Myre 	
1915-1916: P. Steingrimsen 	
1917-1919: Rønning Tollefsen 	
1920-1922: D.E. Jachwitz 	
1923-1925: J. Traasdahl 	
1926-1928: M. Foshaug 
1988-1990: Kristian Eldnes (Ap)
1990-1993: Vidkunn Haugli (V)
1993-1995: Helge Paulsen (Ap)
1995-2003: Lars Nymo (Sp)
2003-2011: Viggo Fossum (Ap)
2011-2015: Helene Rognli (H)
2015-2019: Nils Foshaug (Ap)
2019–present: Bengt-Magne Luneng (Sp)

Economy
A local newspaper, Nye Troms, covering Målselv, Bardu, and Balsfjord, has its main office in the Olsborg/Moen area.

Further south along European route E6 is the Bardufoss region, which encompasses the local communities Andselv, Andslimoen, and Heggelia, the latter including the Norwegian army's 6th division. Near Andselv is the Bardufoss Airport and the Bardufoss Air Station of the Royal Norwegian Air Force, including the 337th and 339th Air Force helicopter squadrons. Målselv municipality, together with neighbouring Bardu, has the largest concentration of army bases in the country.

Moving further up the valley, another local community is Rundhaug, and moving eastwards, closer to Øvre Dividal National Park, is the community of Øverbygd, housing two more sub-communities Skjold and Holt. The former also houses the Skjold base for mechanized infantry and combat engineers.

Tourism is a growing industry in Målselv, with the opening of Målselv Fjellandsby, an alpine ski destination. Målselv is also home to Målselvfossen, Norway's national waterfall and a mecca for salmon fishermen. Bardufoss concentration camp was located here during World War II.

Arne Berggren established a film production hub, Shuuto Arctic, at FilmCamp Nord, a former military base in Målselv. Shuuto Arctic's first production was The River (2017) and was followed by Outlier (2020).

Notable people
 Meyer Foshaug (1868 in Foshaug – 1955), a Norwegian farmer and politician
 Johannes Martens (1870 in Målselv – 1938), a Norwegian newspaper editor
 Erling Mossige (1907 in Målselv – 1997), a Norwegian jurist and banker
 Aase Nordmo Løvberg (1923 in Målselv – 2013), a Norwegian opera soprano 
 William Engseth (born 1933 in Målselv), a Norwegian politician, President of the Norwegian Olympic Committee
 Viggo Fossum (1949–2019), a Norwegian politician, Mayor of Målselv from 2003 to 2011
 Svein Nymo (1953 in Målselv – 2014), a Norwegian violinist and composer
 Geir Pollen (born 1953 in Målselv), a Norwegian poet, novelist and translator
 Karen Anette Anti (born 1972), a Norwegian Sami politician
 Ragnhild Furebotten (born 1979), a Norwegian fiddler, folk musician and composer; lives in Målselv

Sport 
 Jostein Nordmoe (1895 in Målselv – 1965) a Canadian skier, competed at the 1932 Winter Olympics
 Sverre Stenersen (1926 in Målselv – 2005) a Norwegian Nordic combined skier,  bronze medallist at the 1952 Winter Olympics and gold medallist at the 1956 Winter Olympics
 Odd Brandsegg (born 1948 in Målselv) a Swedish former ski jumper
 Erik Valnes (born 1996) a Norwegian cross-country skier

References

External links
Municipal fact sheet from Statistics Norway 

Picture and information regarding Bardufoss Airport from Avinor

 
Municipalities of Troms og Finnmark
Populated places of Arctic Norway
1848 establishments in Norway